Steeve Joseph-Reinette (born 2 December 1983) is a retired French football defender.

Club career
Born in Paris, France, Steeve Joseph-Reinette signed his first professional footballing contract with French Ligue 2 club Guingamp, the club that has boasted stars such as Vincent Candela, Florent Malouda and Didier Drogba, where he went on to make just 27 appearances in five seasons, he then moved on to Italian Serie C2 club Cisco Roma in 2007–2008 season where he showed much improvement by appearing in 38 matches in 2 season, he then moved to a Romanian division 2 club CSM Ploiești.

On 2 August 2009, Reinette signed for two years with Bulgarian Slavia Sofia.

After a brief loan spell with Sibir Novosibirsk, in January 2011, Reinette put pen to paper to a 2.5-year contract with another Russian side - Krylia Sovetov Samara.

External links
Profile at Soccerway

L'équipe 

Living people
1983 births
French footballers
French people of Martiniquais descent
Association football defenders
French expatriate footballers
En Avant Guingamp players
PFC Slavia Sofia players
FC Sibir Novosibirsk players
PFC Krylia Sovetov Samara players
Footballers from Paris
Expatriate footballers in Romania
Expatriate footballers in Bulgaria
French expatriate sportspeople in Bulgaria
Expatriate footballers in Russia
Liga I players
First Professional Football League (Bulgaria) players
Russian Premier League players